The 1981 season was the Philadelphia Eagles' 49th in the National Football League (NFL). They made the postseason for the fourth straight season (the first time in franchise history the Eagles made the postseason four straight times). The team was coming off a loss to the Oakland Raiders in Super Bowl XV the previous season. Because they made the Super Bowl in 1980, the Eagles were picked by many not only to reach the Super Bowl, but to win it as well. The Eagles began the 1981 season with 6 straight wins, their best ever start to a season at the time. They won 3 of their next 5 games for a record of 9–2. Then they lost their next 4 games in a row to slip to 9–6, but clinched a playoff spot for the fourth straight season prior to the final week of the regular season due to owning a tiebreaker with the Packers and not finishing last had the Eagles, Giants, and Packers finished 9–7. The next week, they hammered the St. Louis Cardinals 38–0 to clinch the Wild Card Game would be held in Philadelphia. In the playoffs, they met their arch rivals the New York Giants. It was New York's first playoff appearance in 18 years. The Giants stunned the Eagles 27–21, ending the Eagles' season as well as hopes for a second straight Super Bowl appearance. The Eagles would not make the playoffs again until 1988. They wouldn't reach the Super Bowl again until 2004.

Offseason

NFL Draft
After going 12–4, winning the NFC title and losing in Super Bowl XV to the Oakland Raiders in the 1980 season, the Eagles were slotted to pick next to last in the 12 rounds of the 1981 NFL Draft.

The NFL Draft was the procedure by which National Football League teams selected amateur college football players. It is officially known as the NFL Annual Player Selection Meeting. The draft was held April 28–29, 1981. ESPN covered all 12 rounds live for the first time. ESPN then showed a replay later that night. This was over a period of two days.

The Eagles had the 27th pick in each of the 12 rounds of the draft except for the 5th, 6th, and 8th rounds; they had no picks for these rounds because of draft-day trades. Instead, they had two picks in the 7th round: the 8th and 27th picks. The Eagles drafted a total of 10 players.

Personnel

Staff

Roster

Regular season
The 1981 season schedule was set by how the Eagles finished in 1980, 1st in NFC East. The way it was laid out, 4 of the 5 teams in the same 5 team division could end up having 10 to 14 common opponents during the 1981 season. Also, when the last regular season game is over you know who you play the following year.
A home and away series vs Dallas, New York Giants, St. Louis and Washington = 8 games
The top four teams in the NFC East play the top four teams in the AFC East from the 1980 season = 4 games
The 1st and 4th place teams in NFC Central and NFC West in the 1980 season

Schedule

Note: Intra-division opponents are in bold text.

Game summaries

Week 1
Sunday, September 6, 1981 Kickoff 1:00 PM Eastern

Played at The Meadowlands on an AstroTurf playing surface at 70 °F with an 11 MPH wind

Week 2
Sunday, September 13, 1981 Kickoff 4:00 PM Eastern

TV Broadcast: NBC 
Announcers: Dick Enberg and John Brodie

Played at Veterans Stadium on an AstroTurf playing surface 
weather= 74 °F (Sunny)

Week 3
Thursday, September 17, 1981 Kickoff 8:30 PM Eastern

Played at Rich Stadium on AstroTurf playing surface at 55 °F with an 8 MPH wind

Week 4
Sunday, September 27, 1981 Kickoff 1:00 PM Eastern

Played at Veterans Stadium on an AstroTurf playing surface 
weather= 68 °F (Sunny)

Week 5
Monday, October 5, 1981 Kickoff 9:00 PM Eastern

Played at Veterans Stadium on AstroTurf playing surface 
weather= 62 °F (Clear)

Week 6
Sunday, October 11, 1981 Kickoff 12:00 PM Central

Played at Louisiana Superdome on an AstroTurf playing surface at 72 °F indoors

Week 7
Sunday, October 18, 1981 Kickoff 12:00 PM Central

Played at Metropolitan Stadium on a grass playing surface at 44 °F with a 27 MPH wind

Week 8
Sunday, October 25, 1981 Kickoff 1:00 PM Eastern

Played at Veterans Stadium on an AstroTurf playing surface 
weather= 55 °F (Rain)

Week 9
Sunday, November 1, 1981 Kickoff 4:00 PM Eastern

Played at Veterans Stadium on an AstroTurf playing surface 
weather= 60 °F (Cloudy)

Week 10
Sunday, November 8, 1981 Kickoff 12:00 PM Central

Played at the Busch Memorial Stadium on an AstroTurf playing surface at 57 °F with an 8 mph wind.

Week 11
Sunday, November 15, 1981 Kickoff 1:00 PM Eastern

Played at Veterans Stadium on AstroTurf 
weather= 54 °F (Light rain)

Week 12
Sunday, November 22, 1981 Kickoff 1:00 PM Eastern

Played at Veterans Stadium on an AstroTurf playing surface 
weather= 46 °F (Cloudy)

Week 13
Monday, November 30, 1981 Kickoff 9:00 PM Pacific

Played at Orange Bowl on grass playing surface at 73 °F with an 8 MPH wind

Week 14
Sunday, December 6, 1981 Kickoff 1:00 PM Eastern

Played at Robert F. Kennedy Memorial Stadium on a grass playing surface at 43 °F with a 21 MPH wind

Week 15
Sunday, December 13, 1981 Kickoff 3:00 PM Central

Played at Texas Stadium on an AstroTurf playing surface at 44 °F with a 9 MPH wind

Week 16
Sunday, December 21, 1981 Kickoff 1:00 PM Eastern

Played at Veterans Stadium on AstroTurf playing surface 
weather= 29 °F (Sunny)

Standings

Postseason

Schedule

Game summaries

NFC Wildcard Game
Sunday, December 27, 1981 Kickoff 3:30 PM Eastern

Played at Veterans Stadium on AstroTurf playing surface 
weather= 38 °F (Light drizzle)

References

External links
 1981 Philadelphia Eagles at Pro-Football-Reference.com

Philadelphia Eagles seasons
Philadelphia Eagles
Philadelphia Eagles